Colerain may refer to a location in the United States:

 Colerain, North Carolina
 Colerain, Georgia, the location of a U.S. trading post for the Creek Nation in the 1790s
 Colerain Township (disambiguation), name of several townships

See also
 Colrain (disambiguation)
 Coleraine (disambiguation)